John Henry "Rob" Derbyshire (29 November 1878 – 25 November 1938) was an English freestyle swimmer and water polo player from Chorlton, Lancashire, who competed in the 1900 Summer Olympics (maybe), 1906 Intercalated Games, 1908 Summer Olympics and 1912 Summer Olympics. He and Alice Derbyshire founded swimming clubs in Hammersmith.

Life
At the 1906 Intercalated Games in Athens Derbyshire won a bronze medal as a member of British 4×250 metre freestyle relay team and also competed in the 100 metre freestyle and 400 metre freestyle events. Two years later at London he won a gold medal as a member of British 4×200 metre freestyle relay team and was second in his heat of 100 metre freestyle and did not advance. Four years later at Stockholm he was third in his heat of 100 metre freestyle and did not advance. The International Olympic Committee credits him with a gold medal in water polo at the 1900 Summer Olympics, but this is incorrect as sources contemporary to the Games indicate that he was in England too soon after the tournament to have been in Paris. The Daily Telegraph, dated Saturday, August 11, 1900 reported that Derbyshire did not make the trip and was replaced by Thomas Coe, who like Derbyshire, was a member of the Osborne Swimming Club. 

In 1921 Derbyshire was a founding member of the Penguin Swimming Club, later to become the Hammersmith Penguin Swimming Club through their merger with the Hammersmith Ladies Swimming Club (itself founded by his wife Alice five years before in 1916).

Legacy
In 1950 Alice Derbyshire gave a shield to the club she had co-founded in memory of her husband, It was later named the Rob Derbyshire Memorial Trophy and it is awarded each year to the person who has done best for the club.

In 1976 the club which he and Alice Derbyshire had created was renamed the West London Penguin Swimming and Water Polo Club.

In 2005, he was posthumously inducted into the International Swimming Hall of Fame.

See also
 List of members of the International Swimming Hall of Fame
 List of Olympic medalists in swimming (men)
 World record progression 4 × 200 metres freestyle relay

References

External links
 
 

1878 births
1938 deaths
English male freestyle swimmers
English male water polo players
English Olympic medallists
Olympic swimmers of Great Britain
Swimmers at the 1906 Intercalated Games
Swimmers at the 1908 Summer Olympics
Swimmers at the 1912 Summer Olympics
Olympic gold medallists for Great Britain
World record setters in swimming
Medalists at the 1908 Summer Olympics
Medalists at the 1906 Intercalated Games
Olympic gold medalists in swimming